The Cipinang River is a river flowing in the Special Capital Region of Jakarta, Indonesia. Cipinang river is a tributary of Sunter River, conjoining near I Gusti Ngurah Rai Street and Cipinang Muara Ilir Street, Jakarta, but in the middle it is cut by the beginning of Banjir Kanal Timur, near Cipinang Besar Selatan Street dan IPN Street, Jakarta. The river flows mainly in the district of Makassar, East Jakarta, with many houses built on both banks.

History
Cipinang river has the upstream in Depok, West Java, and flowing to the direction of Banjir Kanal Timur and Sunter River. Its water used to be very clear, that the local people utilized it for bathing, before more people settled there. There were many types of fish found along the river: tilapia, Java barb, dan catfish. Its width reached seven meter with a depth of four meter.

However, in the last ten years more houses were erected on both banks. The river became narrower and its water quality was neglected, until turned black and heavily polluted from various industrial sources. Former ponds on its banks were transformed as trash collection mounds. Therefore, during the rain season the river often causes flooding to the surrounding area. According to the local residents, the worst flood was in 2015. In January 2017, after the normalization was initiated, the condition improved, but the flooding still happened.

Hydrology
The average daily rainfall is 136 mm, with the peak debit at 85 m3.

Geography
The river flows in the northwest area of Java with predominantly tropical rainforest climate (designated as Af in the Köppen-Geiger climate classification). The annual average temperature in the area is 28 °C. The warmest month is September, when the average temperature is around 31 °C, and the coldest is May, at 26 °C. The average annual rainfall is 3674 mm. The wettest month is December, with an average of 456 mm rainfall, and the driest is September, with 87 mm rainfall.

Normalisation 
In 2014 the Jakarta government started the normalisation of Cipinang river, from Cibubur to Banjir Kanal Timur. Pengukuran sudah dilakukan sejak tahun 2014. The river will be widened to 12 meter with a depth of 3 meter. The accumulated garbage was never removed for 30 years until finally was transported completely under the instruction of the Governor Basuki Tjahaja Purnamaon 13 September 2015. For the normalisation of water flow, some residents had to be moved, and the government bought the houses and lands along the banks. The government of Jakarta put much effort for this normalisation to free East Jakarta from future flooding.

Notes and references

Landforms of Jakarta
Rivers of Jakarta
Rivers of Indonesia